Florimond Cornellie (1 May 1894 – 1978) was a Belgian sailor who competed in the 1920 Summer Olympics. He was a crew member of the Belgian boat Edelweiß, which won the gold medal in the 6-metre class (1907 rating).

References

External links
profile

1894 births
1978 deaths
Belgian male sailors (sport)
Sailors at the 1920 Summer Olympics – 6 Metre
Olympic sailors of Belgium
Olympic gold medalists for Belgium
Olympic medalists in sailing
Medalists at the 1920 Summer Olympics
20th-century Belgian people